Ubiquitin-like modifier activating enzyme 1 (UBA1) is an enzyme which in humans is encoded by the UBA1 gene. UBA1 participates in ubiquitination and the NEDD8 pathway for protein folding and degradation, among many other biological processes. This protein has been linked to X-linked spinal muscular atrophy type 2, neurodegenerative diseases, and cancers.

Structure

Gene
The UBA1 gene is located in the chromosome band Xp11.23, consisting of 31 exons.

Protein
The UBA1 for ubiquitin (Ub) is a 110–120 kDa monomeric protein, and the UBA1 for the ubiquitin-like protein (Ubls) NEDD8 and SUMO are heterodimeric complexes with similar molecular weights. All eukaryotic UBA1 contain a two-fold repeat of a domain, derived from the bacterial MoeB and ThiF proteins, with one occurrence each in the N-terminal and C-terminal half of the UBA1 for Ub, or the separate subunits of the UBA1 for NEDD8 and SUMO. The UBA1 for Ub consists of four building blocks: First, the adenylation domains composed of two MoeB/ThiF-homology motifs, the latter of which binds ATP and Ub; second, the catalytic cysteine half-domains, which contain the E1 active site cysteine inserted into each of the adenylation domains; third, a four-helix bundle that represents a second insertion in the inactive adenylation domain and immediately follows the first catalytic cysteine half-domain; and fourth, the C-terminal ubiquitin-fold domain, which recruits specific E2s.

Function 

The protein encoded by this gene catalyzes the first step in ubiquitin conjugation, or ubiquitination, to mark cellular proteins for degradation. Specifically, UBA1 catalyzes the ATP-dependent adenylation of ubiquitin, thereby forming a thioester bond between the two. It also continues to participate in subsequent steps of ubiquination as a Ub carrier. There are only two human ubiquitin-activating enzymes, UBA1 and UBA6, and thus UBA1 is largely responsible for protein ubiquitination in humans. Through its central role in ubiquitination, UBA1 has been linked to cell cycle regulation, endocytosis, signal transduction, apoptosis, DNA damage repair, and transcriptional regulation. Additionally, UBA1 helps regulate the NEDD8 pathway, thus implicating it in protein folding, as well as mitigating the depletion of ubiquitin levels during stress.

Clinical significance 

Mutations in UBA1 are associated with X-linked spinal muscular atrophy type 2. UBA1 has also been implicated in other neurodegenerative diseases, including spinal muscular atrophy, as well as cancer and tumors. Since UBA1 is involved in multiple biological processes, there are concerns that inhibiting UBA1 would also damage normal cells. Nonetheless, preclinical testing of a UBA1 inhibitor in mice with leukemia revealed no additional toxic effects to normal cells, and the success of other drugs targeting pleiotropic targets likewise support the safety of using UBA1 inhibitor in cancer treatment Moreover, the UBA1 inhibitors Largazole, as well as its ketone and ester derivatives, preferentially targets cancer over normal cells by specifically blocking the ligation of Ub and UBA1 during the adenylation step of the E1 pathway. MLN4924, a NEDD8-activating enzyme inhibitor functioning according to similar mechanisms, is currently undergoing phase I clinical trials.

An autoinflammatory condition identified in 2020 and named VEXAS syndrome (vacuoles, E1 enzyme, X-linked, autoinflammatory, somatic) is due to mutation in methionine41 in UBA1, the E1 enzyme that initiates ubiquitylation.

Interactions 
UBA1 has been shown to interact with:
UBC13
PYR-41
himeic acid A 
hyrtioreticulins A–E

References

Further reading

External links